Phil Regan may refer to:

Phil Regan (actor) (1906–1996)
Phil Regan (baseball) (born 1937)